Groove Networks was a software company based in Beverly, Massachusetts. Founded by Ray Ozzie, the creator of IBM's Lotus Notes application, the privately held company specialized in productivity software that allows multiple users to work collaboratively on computer files simultaneously.

On March 10, 2005, Microsoft announced that they had purchased Groove Networks for $120 million. Microsoft has first used the collaboration software as Microsoft SharePoint Workspace, which is discontinued. The technology is now used in OneDrive within Microsoft 365. 

, the servers hosting Groove 2.5n, a DropBox-like application, were still operational.

References

External links
Microsoft SharePoint Workspace

Software companies based in Massachusetts
Defunct software companies of the United States